Local elections were held in the German state of North Rhine-Westphalia on 13 September 2020 to elect district, municipal, and city councils and local boards, as well as mayors in most cities and district administrators in most districts. The 91-member Ruhr Parliament was also elected for the first time. Runoff elections for mayors and district administrators were held on 27 September where necessary.

All EU citizens aged 16 or over on election day were eligible to vote if they had lived in a municipality for at least sixteen days.

Background and electoral system
Local elections take place every five years in North-Rhine Westphalia. However, the previous round of elections had taken place in May 2014. These offices were granted an extraordinary one-time extension to six and a half years in order to synchronise municipal and district council terms with those of mayors and district administrators. The latter offices previously had terms of six years, which was reduced to five years from 2020 onwards. All offices were thus elected simultaneously in September 2020.

Most bodies with multiple members, such as councils, are elected via mixed-member proportional representation, with half of the membership elected in single-member constituencies. Voters have one vote, which is cast for both a constituency candidate and associated party list. There is no electoral threshold. Local boards and the Ruhr Parliament are elected via pure party-list proportional representation with a 2.5% threshold. Elections to a single position, such as mayors and district administrators, are conducted via the two-round system.

The number of members on each district and city/municipal council is determined by the number of residents it serves, and may vary between 20 and 90 members, not counting overhang and leveling seats that can emerge during elections. Councils may legislate to reduce their number of members by up to ten relative to the size bracket they fall into, to a minimum of 20 members.

Parties
The table below lists the results of the 2014 local elections in the rural districts and the urban districts.

Results

Results in independent cities

Results in districts

Ruhr Parliament

References

2020 elections in Germany
Elections in North Rhine-Westphalia